The Grammy Award for Best Music Video is an honor presented at the Grammy Awards, a ceremony that was established in 1958 and originally called the Gramophone Awards, to performers, directors, and producers of quality short form music videos. Honors in several categories are presented at the ceremony annually by the National Academy of Recording Arts and Sciences of the United States to "honor artistic achievement, technical proficiency and overall excellence in the recording industry, without regard to album sales or chart position".

Originally called the Grammy Award for Best Video, Short Form, the award was first presented in 1984, as was a similar award for Best Long Form Music Video. From 1986 to 1997, the category name was changed to Best Music Video, Short Form. However, in 1988 and 1989, the award criteria were changed and the video awards were presented under the categories Best Concept Music Video and Best Performance Music Video. The awards were returned to the original format in 1990. The category was called Best Short Form Music Video until 2012, from 2013 it was shortened to Best Music Video. Award recipients include the performers, directors, and producers associated with the winning videos, except for its first two years when the Grammy went to the performing artist only. For unknown reasons, the award for the Best Music Video in 1987 - Brothers in Arms by Dire Straits - went to the band only, not to the director(s) and/or producer(s).

Peter Gabriel, Michael Jackson, Janet Jackson, Johnny Cash, Kendrick Lamar, Beyoncé, and Taylor Swift hold the record for the most wins as a performer in this category, with two each. Mark Romanek holds the record for the most wins as a director, with a total of three. Icelandic singer Björk holds the record for the most nominations as a performer without a win, with four. Taylor Swift became the first artist to win the category with a sole directing credit for their own music video when she won in 2023 for All Too Well: The Short Film.

Recipients

 Each year is linked to the article about the Grammy Awards held that year.
 Director(s) are only indicated if they were presented with a Grammy Award.
 Award was not presented. Music video categories presented this year included Best Concept Music Video and Best Performance Music Video.

See also
 Latin Grammy Award for Best Short Form Music Video
 List of Grammy Award categories
 List of most expensive music videos
 One shot (music video)

References

General
 
 

Specific

External links
Official website of the Grammy Awards

1984 establishments in the United States
Awards established in 1984
Music Video